Tevin Slater is a Saint Vincent and the Grenadines footballer who plays for Parham FC of the Antigua and Barbuda Premier Division. He has 12 caps for the national team and has scored 8 times.

Career

Club
In late September 2015, it was announced that Slater had signed for Parham FC of the Antigua and Barbuda Premier Division. He had previously played for Camdonia Chelsea SC.

International
Slater made his debut for Saint Vincent and the Grenadines during the 2014 Windward Islands Tournament in their 3-2 win over host nation Dominica. His first international goal came during a 2-2 draw against Barbados. Slater's next goal would come during qualification to the 2018 FIFA World Cup when he scored in a 2-2 draw against Guyana.

National Team Goals
Scores and results list St Vincent and the Grenadines goal tally first.

References

External links
 

Living people
Saint Vincent and the Grenadines footballers
Saint Vincent and the Grenadines international footballers
Association football forwards
1994 births